The Shire of Stephens was a local government area in the inner southern suburbs of Brisbane, Queensland, Australia.

History

On 11 November 1879, the Yeerongpilly Division was created as one of 74 divisions within Queensland under the Divisional Boards Act 1879. On 14 October 1886, following a successful petition from ratepayers to create a new division, Stephens Division was severed from subdivision No. 1 of Yeerongpilly Division. It had a board of six members (3 being elected by each of 2 subdivisions); the first board elections were held in February 1887.

With the passage of the Local Authorities Act 1902, Stephens Division became the Shire of Stephens on 31 March 1903.

A major project undertaken by the shire was the creation of the Yeronga Memorial Park. The land (bounded by Ipswich Road, Villa Street, Park Road & School Road) was originally set aside in 1882 as a recreational reserve. Between 1917 and 1921 the shire redeveloped the park as a memorial to local participation in World War I, 14% of the population having enlisted for military service. The park is listed on both the Queensland Heritage Register and the Brisbane Heritage Register.

In 1923 the Stephens Croquet Club was established in the Yeronga Memorial Park consisting of two lawns and a clubhouse.

The offices for the shire were located on Ipswich Road, between Victoria Terrace and Junction Terrace. In 1923, it was planned to develop a new council chambers, offices and a School of Arts, but this was delayed given the proposal to create Greater Brisbane which would have resulted in the abolition of Stephens Shire.

On 1 October 1925, the Shire of Stephens was abolished and its area became part of the new City of Brisbane.

The shire offices and associated land were sold in 1929. The building was relocated to the rear of the block and turned to face the street behind (its street address is now 15 Ealing Street) and was altered for use as a residence. It is listed on the Brisbane Heritage Register.

The name Stephens survives in the Stephens Croquet Club which continues to operate under that name.

Chairmen and presidents
 1903: P. Marshall 
 1905, and another year between 1904 and 1907: Alexander McNab 
 1906: H. W. Luya 
 1908: Mr McCosker 
 1925: F. A. Stimson 
 George Grimes

Population

The population of Stephen Shire was:

Localities
 Annerley
 Fairfield
 Greenslopes (split with Shire of Coorparoo)
 Holland Park West
 Moorooka
 Tarragindi (split with Shire of Yeerongpilly)
 Yeerongpilly (split with Shire of Yeerongpilly)
 Yeronga

References

Further reading

External links
 

Former local government areas of Queensland
1886 establishments in Australia
Annerley, Queensland
1925 disestablishments in Australia